Caledonia Charter Township is a charter township of Shiawassee County in the U.S. state of Michigan.  The population was 4,475 at the 2010 census.

Communities
Kerby is an unincorporated communitywithin the township on Kerby Road. State maps place it at Serr Road while the Federal government places it on Shipman Road from Kerby Road.,  The community was named for Samuel W. Kerby, an early settler.
Middletown is an unincorporated area and census-designated place within the township between Corunna and Owosso.

Geography

Demographics
As of the census of 2000, there were 4,427 people, 1,712 households, and 1,287 families residing in the township. The racial makeup of the township was 97.24% White, 0.14% African American, 0.32% Native American, 0.61% Asian, 0.02% Pacific Islander, 0.68% from other races, and 0.99% from two or more races. Hispanic or Latino of any race were 1.65% of the population.

There were 1,712 households, out of which 32.2% had children under the age of 18 living with them, 63.4% were married couples living together, 8.2% had a female householder with no husband present, and 24.8% were non-families. 20.9% of all households were made up of individuals, and 10.1% had someone living alone who was 65 years of age or older.  The average household size was 2.58 and the average family size was 2.97.

In the township the population was spread out, with 24.2% under the age of 18, 7.4% from 18 to 24, 28.2% from 25 to 44, 27.0% from 45 to 64, and 13.2% who were 65 years of age or older.  The median age was 40 years. For every 100 females, there were 97.9 males.  For every 100 females age 18 and over, there were 95.3 males.

The median income for a household in the township was $42,139, and the median income for a family was $50,564. Males had a median income of $40,483 versus $26,971 for females. The per capita income for the township was $19,385.  About 5.7% of families and 5.7% of the population were below the poverty line, including 3.1% of those under age 18 and 10.0% of those age 65 or over.  Joseph W. DeCaire (D), currently serves as the Caledonia Charter Township Supervisor, a position he was elected to in November 2006.

Transportation

Highways

 (runs south–north just outside of the western boundary of the township)

Airport
 Owosso Community Airport

See also 
McArthur Mining Company – Michigan's first coal mine.

References 

Townships in Shiawassee County, Michigan
Charter townships in Michigan